Étangs Noirs (French) or Zwarte Vijvers (Dutch) is a Brussels metro station. It is located at the border between the municipalities of Koekelberg and Molenbeek-Saint-Jean, in the western part of Brussels, Belgium.

The station opened on 8 May 1981 as part of the Sainte-Catherine/Sint-Katelijne–Beekkant extension of former line 1. Following the reorganisation of the Brussels Metro on 4 April 2009, it is served by lines 1 and 5, which cross Brussels from east to west. Its name translates into English as the "Black Ponds".

External links

Brussels metro stations
Railway stations opened in 1981
Molenbeek-Saint-Jean
Koekelberg